Władysławowo is a town in Pomeranian Voivodeship (north Poland).

Władysławowo may also refer to:

Władysławowo, Kuyavian-Pomeranian Voivodeship (north-central Poland)
Władysławowo, Podlaskie Voivodeship (north-east Poland)
Władysławowo, Łódź Voivodeship (central Poland)
Władysławowo, Ciechanów County in Masovian Voivodeship (east-central Poland)
Władysławowo, Płońsk County in Masovian Voivodeship (east-central Poland)
Władysławowo, Żuromin County in Masovian Voivodeship (east-central Poland)
Władysławowo, Gmina Kleczew in Greater Poland Voivodeship (west-central Poland)
Władysławowo, Gmina Wierzbinek in Greater Poland Voivodeship (west-central Poland)
Władysławowo, Nowy Tomyśl County in Greater Poland Voivodeship (west-central Poland)
Władysławowo, Warmian-Masurian Voivodeship (north Poland)